Stuart Galbraith is a British live music event promoter. He is the founder of Kilimanjaro Live Group, one of the United Kingdom's largest event promoters.

History

Starting his career as Events Booker at Leeds University and then at independent promoter MCP, Galbraith went on to become Managing Director of Live Nation and was responsible for the creation of Download Festival, Wireless Festival, Hyde Park Calling and the  Live8 Concert.

Secondary ticketing legal battle

Stuart Galbraith through the companies he controls take a fierce anti secondary ticketing stance. Having been a supporter of the Fanfair Alliance in the UK an organisation lobbying for legal controls over the secondary market.

Viagogo a Swiss secondary ticketing platform filed a lawsuit against Mr Galbraith and Kilimanjaro Live in Germany over the anti touting rules placed on Ed Sheeran tickets on his 2018 tour.

Stuart Galbraith has appeared on the parliamentary Commons Select Committee providing evidence on a Ticket abuse enquiry accused a number of prominent sites of reselling concert tickets in breach of the Consumer Rights Act. Viagogo were invited to the debate but refused to show up.

Stuart Galbraith targets Google adwords as also profiteering from the secondary markets breach of law.

Charity work
Stuart Galbraith is a committee member of Nordoff Robbins Silver Clef, The leading independent music therapy charity in the UK, dedicated to changing the lives of vulnerable and isolated people.

Stuart also is a regular fundraiser and keen cyclist and regular face on the Truants charity cycle ride.

References

External links
Kilimanjaro Live Website
Sonisphere Website
Wakestock Festival Website
Vans Warped Tour Website

Living people
Music promoters
Galbraith, Stuart
Alumni of the University of Leeds
Year of birth missing (living people)